Equestrian competitions at the 2015 Pan American Games in Toronto were held from July 11 to 25 at the Caledon Equestrian Park in Palgrave. The cross-country portion of eventing took place at nearby Will O' Wind Farm (Pan Am Cross-Country Centre), which is located in Mono. Due to naming rights the venue was known as the latter for the duration of the games. The competition was split into three disciplines, dressage, eventing and show jumping. Each discipline awarded a team and individual set of medals.

The top team not already qualified in the dressage and eventing team events qualified for the 2016 Summer Olympics in Rio de Janeiro, Brazil, along with the top two placed teams (not already qualified) in the show jumping competition. In the individual dressage competition, the top nation (not qualified in the team event) in groups IV and V each qualified one quota. The top six athletes (not qualified in the team event) also qualified for the show jumping competition.

Competition schedule

The following is the competition schedule for the equestrian  competitions:

Medal table

Medalists

Participating nations
A total of 19 countries have qualified athletes. The number of athletes a nation has entered is in parentheses beside the name of the country.

Qualification

A quota of 150 equestrian riders (45 dressage, 50 eventing and 55 show jumping) were allowed to qualify. A maximum of 12 athletes could compete for a nation across all events (with a maximum of four per event). Athletes qualified through various qualifying events and rankings.

See also
 Equestrian at the 2016 Summer Olympics

References

 
Events at the 2015 Pan American Games
2015
Pan American Games
Pan American Games